The Alert Bay Volcanic Belt is a heavily eroded Neogene volcanic belt in northern Vancouver Island, British Columbia, Canada. The belt is now north of the Nootka Fault, but may have been directly above the fault at the time it last erupted. Eruptions of basaltic to rhyolitic volcanoes and hypabyssal rocks of the Alert Bay Volcanic Belt are probably linked with the subducted margin flanked by the Explorer and Juan de Fuca plates at the Cascadia subduction zone. The Alert Bay Volcanic Belt is poorly studied, but appears to have been active in Miocene to Pliocene time. No Holocene eruptions are known, and volcanic activity in the belt has most likely ceased.

Features
The features within the belt include:
Cluxewe Mountain
Haddington Island
Klaskish Plutonic Suite
Twin Peaks

See also
Garibaldi Volcanic Belt
Pemberton Volcanic Belt

Canadian Cascade Arc
Volcanic belts
Northern Vancouver Island
Geography of Vancouver Island
Miocene volcanism
Pliocene volcanism